Secret Weapon is a 1990 American-Australian film.

It is the true story of Mordechai Vanunu, the Israeli nuclear technician who revealed to the world his country's nuclear weapons capabilities.

Cast 
 Griffin Dunne as Mordechai Vanunu
 Karen Allen as Ruth
 Jeroen Krabbe as Asher
 Stuart Wilson as Peter Hounam
 John Rhys-Davies as Mossad Chief
 Brian Cox as Andrew Neil
 Joe Petruzzi as Felix Romero
 Iain Mitchell as Robin Morgan
 Patrick Bailey as Leo Perkins
 Ronnie Stevens as Professor Barber

References

External links

Australian television films
1990 films
1990s English-language films